Mark Wilkinson (born 3 October 1952) is an English illustrator. He is best known for the detailed surrealistic cover art he created for a number of British bands.

Wilkinson's breakthrough came through his association with the neo-progressive rock band Marillion in the 1980s. He went on to design art for the subsequent solo career of their lead singer, Fish, as well as bands such as Judas Priest and Iron Maiden. Though versed in a number of techniques, he is considered to be a master of the airbrush.

In 2012, his sleeve for the 1984 Marillion album Fugazi was chosen by Gigwise as the 29th greatest album artwork of all time. In 2015, Wilkinson designed the artwork for the Tya Brewery in Øvre Årdal, Norway.

Biography
Wilkinson was inspired by 1960s artists such as Hapshash and the Coloured Coat (a collaboration between Michael English and Nigel Waymouth) and Rick Griffin.

Wilkinson's break came with his designs for Marillion in the 1980s, who were then second only to Iron Maiden in terms of their sales of T-shirts and merchandise. Wilkinson's first artistic creation for Marillion was the cover of their debut 12" EP Market Square Heroes  (1982). Subsequently, Wilkinson's art work would be used on all of Marillion's albums and 12" releases through The Thieving Magpie (1988). When Fish left the band Wilkinson went with him, providing the artwork for many of his albums and singles; aside from compilations, Songs from the Mirror is the only studio album by Fish not to feature cover art by Wilkinson. In 1997, he collaborated with Bill Smith Studios (which had replaced him as Marillion's official art group) on the Best of Both Worlds compilation CD. The compilation included songs from the eras of the band with and without Fish, and the record label, EMI, decided it should also include artwork reflective of both eras. In 2000, Fish and Wilkinson collaborated on a book, Masque, which, in "back and forth" format, described the process by which the Fish and Marillion album covers were created. Wilkinson will likely always be most closely identified with Fish and Marillion (in a similar fashion to Roger Dean's association with Yes or Paul Whitehead's association with Genesis).

Wilkinson's work for Marillion gained attention and led to him designing Monsters of Rock posters. This in turn brought him to the attention of heavy metal band Judas Priest. He has named "The Four Horsemen" from Judas Priest's 2008 album Nostradamus as the work he is most pleased with. He has designed miscellaneous pieces for Bon Jovi, Jimmy Page, the Who and Kylie Minogue. Outside of the music community, he has also done numerous book covers, advertisements, comic art (including a 1993 Judge Anderson episode in the Judge Dredd Megazine) and commissioned pieces.

Works

Album covers
Album covers include:

 Marillion
 Script for a Jester's Tear
 Fugazi
 Real to Reel
 Misplaced Childhood
 Clutching at Straws
 The Thieving Magpie
 Fish
 Vigil in a Wilderness of Mirrors
 Internal Exile
 Suits
 Sunsets on Empire
 Raingods with Zippos
 Fellini Days
 Field of Crows
 13th Star
 A Feast of Consequences
 Weltschmerz
 Judas Priest
 Ram It Down
 Painkiller
 Jugulator
 Angel of Retribution
 Nostradamus
 Redeemer of Souls
 Iron Maiden 
 Live at Donington (1998 remastered version)
 Best of the 'B' Sides (2002 compilation)
 The Book of Souls
 Senjutsu

Comics
Interior comics work includes:

 Judge Anderson: "Voyage of the seeker" (with Alan Grant, in Judge Dredd Megazine, 2.37, 1993)

Comics covers
Comics covers include:

 Judge Dredd Megazine #2.10, 2.15, 2.20, 2.27, 2.30, 2.32, 2.37, 2.48, 2.50, 2.63, 3.04 (1992–1995)

References

External links

Mark Wilkinson at 2000 AD online
 

1952 births
Living people
People from Windsor, Berkshire
English comics artists
British surrealist artists
Fantastic art